The Billboard Music Award winners for Top Christian Artist. Notable recipients include Hillsong United and Chris Tomlin.

Winners and nominees

Superlatives

Wins
 3 (Lauren Daigle)
 2 (Hillsong United, Chris Tomlin)

Nominations
7 (MercyMe)
 6 (Casting Crowns)
 5 (Chris Tomlin, Lauren Daigle)
4 (Hillsong United, Elevation Worship, KING & COUNTRY)
3 (Skillet)
2 (TobyMac, ye)

References

Billboard awards